Dead of Winter may refer to:
Dead of Winter (film), a 1987 thriller film
 "Dead of Winter" (short story), a 2006 horror story
 The Dead of Winter, a 2006 novel by Rennie Airth
 Dead of Winter (Cole novel), a 2015 young adult fantasy novel written by Kresley Cole
 Dead of Winter (Goss novel), a 2011 Doctor Who novel by James Goss
 "The Dead of Winter", an episode of the TV series Lewis (TV series)
 Dead of Winter: A Cross Roads Game, a board game by Plaid Hat Games set in a zombie apocalypse
 The Dead of Winter, 1975 novel by Dominic Cooper

See also
 Winter solstice
Midwinter (disambiguation)